Kvetoslavov is a village and municipality in the Dunajská Streda District in the Trnava Region of south-west Slovakia.

History
In historical records, the village was first recorded in 1230 as "Vzor".

Until the end of World War I, it was part of Hungary and fell within the Somorja district of Pozsony County. After the Austro-Hungarian army disintegrated in November 1918, Czechoslovakian troops occupied the area. After the Treaty of Trianon of 1920, the village became officially part of Czechoslovakia. In November 1938, the First Vienna Award granted the area to Hungary and it was held by Hungary until 1945. After Soviet occupation in 1945, Czechoslovakian administration returned and the village became officially part of Czechoslovakia in 1947.

As a part of a forced population exchange initiated by Czechoslovakia, approximately one third of the village’s Hungarian population was expulsed to Hungary by Czechoslovakian authorities and were replaced by ethnic Slovaks from southern-Hungary.

Demography 

Census 2011 - 948 inhabitants :
596 people (63%) of Slovak nationality, 258 people (27%) Hungarians and 95 (10%), other nationality.

There were 262 people according to the 1910 census. In 2001 – 822 people and at the end of 2008 estimate by the Statistical Office had the village's population at 932 people. 
Roman Catholicism is the major religion of the village, its adherents numbering at 85.30% of the total population.

Transport 
Kvetoslavov lies on railway number 131 connecting Bratislava with Komárno.
Newly built speedway R7 runs just outside of the village where interchange is only kilometer away.

References 

Villages and municipalities in Dunajská Streda District
Hungarian communities in Slovakia